Hale is a neighborhood (within the larger Nokomis community) near the southern edge of Minneapolis.  It lies south of Minnehaha Creek, north of 55th Street, east of Chicago Avenue, and west of Cedar Avenue.  The neighborhood takes its name from the local public school, Nathan Hale.  Nathan Hale is a K-4 school.  Most of the homes in the area were built in the 1920s and 30s.  The regional parks forming the neighborhood's north and east borders give the neighborhood a recreational heart.

Hale is one of three neighborhoods that banded together to form HPDL.

References

External links
Minneapolis Neighborhood Profile - Hale
Hale Page Diamond Lake Community Association
 HPDL business directory.

Neighborhoods in Minneapolis